Mannosylglucosyl-3-phosphoglycerate synthase (MggA) is an enzyme with systematic name GDP-mannose:2-O-(alpha-D-glucosyl)-3-phospho-D-glycerate 2-O-alpha-D-mannosyltransferase. This enzyme catalyses the following chemical reaction

 GDP-mannose + 2-O-(alpha-D-glucopyranosyl)-3-phospho-D-glycerate  GDP + 2-O-[2-O-(alpha-D-mannopyranosyl)-alpha-D-glucopyranosyl]-3-phospho-D-glycerate

The enzyme is involved in synthesis of 2-[2-O-(alpha-D-mannopranosyl)-alpha-D-glucopyranosyl]-D-glycerate.

References

External links 

EC 2.4.1